Apacilagua is a small town and municipality in the Honduran department of Choluteca. The small town of Apacilagua lies on the Choluteca River along the RN85 road, and contains the Iglesia Catolica Apacilagua, a Catholic church. As of 2015 it had a population of 9,075 people.

History
The municipality was established in 1831. At the time of the census of 1887 it was listed as a municipality within Orocuina District.

In August 2012, the Centro de Documentación e Información para la Seguridad Alimentaria y Nutricional (Documentation and Information Center for Food and Nutrition Security) (CEDESAN) was established in Apacilagua, opened by the mayor, Rafael Mendoza.  The centre is affiliated with the Programa Regional de Seguridad Alimentaria y Nutricional para Centroamérica (Regional Program for Food and Nutrition Security for Central America) (PRESANCA), which seeks to ensure food and nutritional safety within Central America, which has the financial support of the European Union, the Spanish Agency for International Development Cooperation (AECID), the United Nations Development Program (UNDP) and the Government of  Finland.

Geography
Apacilagua lies on the Choluteca River along the RN85 road.

Villages and hamlets
The municipal area contains eight villages (aldeas) and 149 hamlets. The eight villages are:

 Apacilagua (seat of municipality)
 La Albarrada
 La Garza
 Los Limones
 Los Mezcales
 Monte Grande
 San Felipe
 Somuina

Economic Activities 
89% of the economic activity comes from Agriculture, Cattle, Forestry, and Fishing. 1.7% comes from teaching, 1.6% from Wholesale, Retail, and Vehicle Repair. 3% from Manufacturing and Construction and 4.9% from other sources.

References

Municipalities of the Choluteca Department